A maternal bond is the relationship between a  mother and her child. While typically associated with pregnancy and childbirth, a maternal bond may also develop in cases where the child is unrelated, such as an adoption.

Both physical and emotional factors influence the mother-child bonding process. In separation anxiety disorder a child becomes fearful and nervous when away from a loved one, usually a parent or other caregiver. New mothers do not always experience instant love toward their child. Instead, the bond can strengthen over time, or fail to develop. Bonds can take hours, days, weeks, or months to develop.

Pregnancy
The maternal bond between a woman and her biological child usually begins to develop during pregnancy. The pregnant female adapts her lifestyle to suit the needs of the developing infant. At around 18 to 25 weeks, the mother begins to feel the fetus moving. Similar to seeing her child for the first time in an ultrasound scan, this experience typically leads the mother to feel more attached to her child.

The developing fetus has some awareness of the mother's heartbeat and voice and has the ability to respond to touch or movement. By the seventh month of pregnancy, two-thirds of women report a strong maternal bond with their unborn child.

Some mothers who did not want the pregnancy may not have a close relationship with the child. They are more likely to suffer from post-partum depression or other mental health problems and less likely to breast feed.

Childbirth
Childbirth is an experience that can strengthen the mother and child bond. Factors such as a traumatic birth, the mother's childhood, medical stress, lack of support and the influence of a spouse or partner can weaken the bond.

Emotional bonding theory first appeared in the mid-1970s, and by the 1980s had become an accepted phenomenon. Soon, the process became analyzed and scrutinized to the point of creating another term – poor bonding.

Oxytocin
Production of oxytocin during childbirth and lactation increases parasympathetic activity. Thus, anxiety is theoretically reduced. Maternal oxytocin circulation is said to predispose women to bond and show bonding behavior, although this has been disputed.

Breastfeeding is also strongly believed to foster the bond, via touch, response and mutual gazing.

Moral side effects
A 2014 study claimed that oxytocin promotes dishonesty when the outcome favors the closely bonded groups to which an individual belongs.  A real-world example of this effect can be seen when parents lie about their address to gain admission to better schools for their children.

Maternal separation anxiety
Beginning at 9–10 months of age when infants begin to crawl and then when they begin to walk around 12 months of age, they begin to develop capacities to physically explore the world away from their mother. These capacities bring with them separation anxiety as the infant becomes more vulnerable away from mother.  This newly acquired motor development parallels infants' intellectual curiosity, cognitive and language development as they begin to point and name, and jointly attend with mothers to their environment beginning by 9–10 months.  Most parents welcome these explorations and this increased independence. However, in the context of maternal depression, trauma or disturbed bonding in her own early life, some mothers have significant difficulty in tolerating the exploration and-or the infant's anxiety.

This anxiety increases when infants and toddlers feel threatened or socially reference their mothers for reassurance. Research claimed out that mothers, for example, with histories of violence-exposure and post-traumatic stress show less activity in the medial prefrontal cortex, a brain area that helps to temper and contextualize fear responses, and thus are likely unable to extinguish their own fear response upon watching a videotaped mother-toddler separation scene in a magnetic resonance imaging scanner.

Inevitably, children who have rarely been separated from their mother become anxious when separated for extended periods. This is most commonly experienced when starting to attend school. Every child suffers to some extent.

Later in life, this anxiety can reoccur if mothers have to leave their family unit to work. In both cases, the child's anxiety (and that of the parents) can be reduced by priming, i.e. preparing the child for the experience prior to its occurrence and by creating and maintaining dialogue and connection between the absent parent and child during the separation.

See also
 Postpartum confinement
 Human bonding
 Paternal bond
 Cinderella effect
 Mother's boy
 Babywearing, co-sleeping
 Breastfeeding and mental health

Footnotes

Evolutionary psychology
Intimate relationships
Motherhood